A battle buddy is a partner assigned to a soldier in the United States Army. Each battle buddy is expected to assist their partner both in and out of combat. A battle buddy is not only intended for company, but also for the reduction of suicide; since each watches their partner's actions, a battle buddy can save their fellow soldier's life by noticing negative thoughts and feelings and intervening to provide help. Most participating soldiers have reported satisfaction and have agreed that the Army should implement the system fully, although there have been cons reported as well.

Advantages and disadvantages 

Evaluations of the battle buddy system have identified the following advantages:

Reduces rates of suicide and sexual assaults
Buddies keep each other informed about key instructions and information
Promotes cooperative problem-solving 
Increases morale
Encourages soldiers and motivates increased confidence
Decreases stress
Eases transition to the military lifestyle
Improves safety in training and combat
Promotes better leadership skills

The following potential disadvantages have also been identified:

Personality conflicts can cause tension and decrease positive effects
Adds extra responsibilities
Interferes with desired activities
Requires the commitment of caring for another person

Evaluations 

Soldiers were asked to evaluate and rate their satisfaction with the "Battle Buddy Team Assignment Program" in order to gauge whether the program should be implemented by the Army. Surveys were created to assess:

The role of personality variables
Self-assessments of successes due to battle buddies
Potential situational influences
Buddy interactions/assessments

The following table displays soldiers' ratings of satisfaction with the Battle Buddy system:

This table shows soldiers' agreement that battle buddies are good Army practice:

Suicide prevention 

Suicide prevention is a major objective of the battle buddy system.  In 2006, the suicide rate in the U.S. Army increased by 37% and, by 2009, there were 344 completed suicides by military personnel (211 of whom were members of the Army). In response, efforts to identify suicide prevention initiatives have increased; military and legislative officials found the assignment of battle buddies to be an effective method of decreasing military suicide rates.

See also 
 Buddy system
 Suicide prevention

References

United States Army doctrine
Military life